This is a list of members of the 9th National Assembly of South Korea which sat from 12 March 1973 until 11 March 1979.

Members

Seoul

Busan

Gyeonggi

Gangwon

North Chungcheong

South Chungcheong

North Jeolla

South Jeolla

North Gyeongsang

South Gyeongsang

Jeju

Presidential appointments

Notes

See also 

 1973 South Korean legislative election
 National Assembly (South Korea)#History

References 

009
National Assembly members 009